Pietro Paolo Eustachi (1580–1622) was a Roman Catholic prelate who served as Bishop of Boiano (1613–1622).

Biography
Pietro Paolo Eustachi was born in 1580. On 15 July 1613, he was appointed by Pope Paul V as Bishop of Boiano. He served as Bishop of Boiano until his death in 1622.

References

External links and additional sources
 (for Chronology of Bishops) 
 (for Chronology of Bishops) 

1580 births
1622 deaths
17th-century Italian Roman Catholic bishops
Bishops appointed by Pope Paul V